The men's 2005 World Amateur Boxing Championships were held in Mianyang, China, from November 13 to November 20. The competition was organised by the world's governing body for amateur boxing  AIBA.

Medal winners

Medal table

External links
Results
USA Boxing

World Amateur Boxing Championships
World Amateur Boxing Championships
AIBA World Boxing Championships
B
Mianyang
November 2005 sports events in Asia